This is a comparison of battery electric vehicles.

Range

Charging time per driven distance

The amount of range gained per time charging, charging speed, is the ratio of charging power to the vehicle's consumption, and its inverse is the charging time per driven distance:

The triple bar equality symbolizes that these measures, equivalent as they are, are both meaningful as instantaneous values, not only as averages. Typically, charging power varies with state of charge and battery temperature over a charging session.

Utility

See also
List of electric cars currently available

References

Electric vehicles